Daryapur Assembly constituency is one of the 288 constituencies of Maharashtra Vidhan Sabha and one of the eight which are located in Amravati district. It is reserved for Scheduled Caste candidates.

It is a part of the Amravati (Lok Sabha constituency) along with five other Vidhan Sabha assembly constituencies, viz. Badnera, Amravati, Teosa, Melghat (ST) and Achalpur.

The remaining two Dhamangaon Railway and Morshi constituencies are part of the Wardha (Lok Sabha constituency) in the adjoining Wardha district.

As per orders of Delimitation of Parliamentary and Assembly constituencies Order, 2008, No. 40 Daryapur Assembly constituency is composed of the following: 
1. Daryapur Tehsil, 2. Anjangaon Surji Tehsil 3. Achalpur Tehsil (Part), Revenue Circle Rasegaon of the district.

Members of Legislative Assembly

Election Result

Assembly Elections 2019

References

Assembly constituencies of Maharashtra
Amravati district